Khomutovka is a rural locality (a village) in Starodubsky District, Bryansk Oblast, Russia. The population was 109 as of 2010. There are 5 streets.

Geography 
Khomutovka is located 19 km southeast of Starodub (the district's administrative centre) by road. Mishkovka is the nearest rural locality.

References 

Rural localities in Starodubsky District